Alfredo Bryce Echenique (born February 19, 1939) is a Peruvian writer born in Lima. He has written numerous books and short stories.

Early days
Bryce was born to a Peruvian family of upper class, related to the Scottish-Peruvian businessman John Weddle Bryce (1817 in Edinburgh – 9 March 1888), ancestor of the Marquesses of Milford-Haven and of the Duchesses of Abercon and Westminster. He was the third son and the fourth of the five children of the banker Francisco Bryce Arróspide and his wife, Elena Echenique Basombrío, granddaughter of the former President José Rufino Echenique.

Bryce studied elementary education at Inmaculado Corazón school, and high school at Santa María school and Saint Paul's College, a British boarding school for boys in Lima. Upon the wish of his family, Bryce Echenique studied law at the National University of San Marcos, where he obtained his degree in 1964. His literary interest nevertheless prevailed and so, shortly afterwards, he completed a parallel Bachelor of Arts in literature with a thesis on Ernest Hemingway in 1963. In 1988 he adopted Spanish nationality without losing his Peruvian one.

Literary career
He received a grant from the French government which, like many other Latin American authors of the boom period, led him to Paris in 1964. At the Sorbonne he studied classic and contemporary French literature for one academic year. Between 1965 and 1966 he subsequently lived in Peruggia, Mykonos and Germany, where he moved to study German thanks to a grant from the Goethe-Institut.

Bryce returned to France and taught Spanish in a school at Le Maurais from 1967 to 1968. This year, he published his first book Huerto Cerrado and the next year became a lecturer of Latin American literature at Paris Nanterre University and since 1971 at the Sorbonne. In 1970 he had been published A World for Julius.

In 1972 he was awarded the Peruvian National Prize for Literature and in 1973 he entered as an assistant lecturer to the University of Vincennes (Paris VIII). A few years later in 1975, Bryce received a Guggenheim grant and obtained a master's degree in comparative literature from Vincennes. In 1977, he returned to Peru and received his doctoral degree from San Marcos University with a thesis on Henri de Montherlant.

In 1980 he moved to Montpellier, where he entered the Paul Valéry University as a professor. In 1984, Bryce settled down in Spain living first in Barcelona and since 1989 in Madrid. In 1997, he returned to Peru, where he currently lives.

His first book Huerto Cerrado published in 1968, was a finalist for the Casa de las Américas literary prize awarded in Cuba and is a collection of short stories written in different styles and points of view about a young protagonist, Manolo, a member of Lima's upper class, as he comes of age in 1950s Lima.  This was followed by his first novel, Un Mundo para Julius, published in 1970 that became a big success and counts today as one of the classics of Latin American literature. The novel, which has since been translated into ten languages, tells the story of a young boy who grows up as the youngest of four children of a rich, Peruvian upper-class family. Although Julius actually belongs to the ruling classes he feels a stronger bond with the servants which surround him and this brings him into conflict with his family. With biting irony the author exposes, through the eyes of a child, the great social differences in Peruvian society.

Recent successes

Un mundo para Julius marks for Bryce Echenique the start of an extremely productive literary career, in which he has until today written nearly twenty novels and story volumes.

"I am an author of the second half of the 20th century." Despite this declaration and his spatial and temporal closeness to other Latin American authors of the boom generation, Bryce Echenique keeps a conscious distance from his colleagues who he sometimes refers to as "nouveau riche". That his style, as one critic once said, corresponds more to an ironic than a magic realism, is also shown by the author in one of his latest novels: La amigdalitis de Tarzán from 1999. Largely in the form of letters, the novel relates the story of the hindered romantic relationship between a poor Peruvian troubadour and the daughter of an influential Salvadoran family.

Similar to his heroes, Alfredo Bryce Echenique also lived for decades far from his home city of Lima to which he only returned in 1999. Also that year he was granted an honorary degree by the Universidad Nacional Mayor de San Marcos.

Claims of plagiarism 
In March, 2007, Peruvian Diplomat Oswaldo de Rivero wrote an article for the newspaper El Comercio of Lima, Peru accusing Bryce of writing an article "Potencias sin poder" that was an almost exact copy of one written by de Rivero in the magazine "Quehacer" in March, 2005.  Bryce responded saying the article had been submitted in error by his secretary.

Juan Carlos Bondy subsequently found evidence that Bryce had earlier plagiarized the article "Amistad, bendito tesoro" by Ángel Esteban that had appeared in La Nación of Argentina in December, 1996. Bryce has also been accused of plagiarizing articles by Graham E. Fuller and Herbert Morote.

Journalism professor María Soledad de la Cerda found sixteen other instances of plagiarism which were found as a result of research for her course in investigative journalism.

Bibliography

Novels
 Un mundo para Julius (English version: A world for Julius), 1970
 Tantas veces Pedro, 1977
 La vida exagerada de Martín Romaña, 1981
 El hombre que hablaba de Octavia Cádiz, 1985 (Along with the last forms a diptych called: Cuaderno de navegación en un sillón voltaire)
 La última mudanza de Felipe Carrillo, 1988
 Dos señoras conversan (thee novelettes), 1990
 No me esperen en Abril, 1995
 Reo de Nocturnidad, 1997
 La Amigdalitis de Tarzán (English version: Tarzan's Tonsillitis, an epistolary novel), 1998
 El huerto de mi amada, 2002 (Winner in 2002 of the Planet Award)

Story books
 Huerto Cerrado, 1968
 La felicidad, ja ja, 1974
 Magdalena peruana y otros cuentos, 1988
 Guía triste de París (English version: A sad tour of Paris), 1999

Chronicles
 A vuelo de buen cubero, 1977
 Crónicas personales, 1998
 A trancas y barrancas, 1996
 Crónicas perdidas, 2001
 Doce cartas a dos amigos, 2003

Memoirs
 Permiso para vivir - Antimemorias I, 1993
 Permiso para Sentir - Antimemorias II, 2005

Essays
 Entre la soledad y el amor, 2005

Awards 
 Casa de las Américas Prize for Huerto cerrado (accessit), 1968
 Peruvian National Prize for Literature for A World for Julius, 1972
 Prix du Meilleur Livre Étranger (finalist), 1974
 Prix Passion, 1984
 Chevalier and later ascended to Official of the Ordre des Arts et des Lettres, 1984 and 1995
 Commander of the Order of Isabella the Catholic, 1993
 Order of the Sun (rejected)
 Dag Hammarskjöld Peace Prize, 1997
 National Literature Prize for Narrative of Spain for Reo de Nocturnidad, 1998
 Doctor Honoris Causa from San Marcos University, 1999
 Commander of the Order of Alfonso XII of Spain, 2000
 Grinzane Cavour Prize for Tarzan's Tonsillitis, 2002
 Premio Planeta de Novela for El huerto de mi amada, 2002
 FIL Literary Award in Romance Languages, 2012

See also
Peruvian literature
List of Peruvian writers

Notes

External links
Portrait of Alfredo Bryce Echenique by Braun-Vega (1983)

1939 births
Living people
Peruvian people of Scottish descent
Peruvian people of Spanish descent
University of Paris alumni
Peruvian novelists
Peruvian male writers
Peruvian male short story writers
National University of San Marcos alumni
Recipients of the Order of the Sun of Peru
Male novelists
Writers from Lima
Peruvian expatriates in France